George Gordon Harvey Walden  (born 15 September 1939) is an English journalist, former diplomat and former politician for the Conservative Party, who served as MP for Buckingham from 1983 to 1997 and Minister for Higher Education under Margaret Thatcher.

Education
Walden was educated at Latymer Upper School in Hammersmith, London, at Jesus College, Cambridge, and for post-graduate studies at Moscow University. During his time in the diplomatic service he studied Chinese at the University of Hong Kong 1965–67, spent a year at the École nationale d'administration (ÉNA, then located in Paris) 1973–74, and a sabbatical year at Harvard 1981–82.

Diplomat
Walden joined the Foreign Office in 1962 and worked there as a researcher until 1965 when he went to Hong Kong to study Chinese. After that he was posted as Second Secretary in the office of the British Chargé d'Affaires in Peking 1967–70 (there was no ambassador at that time). As First Secretary he was at the Soviet Desk in the Foreign and Commonwealth Office (FCO) 
1970–73 (during which he was formally appointed an Officer in the Diplomatic Service) and, after his year at ÉNA, at the British Embassy in Paris 1974–78. He was then appointed Principal Private Secretary to the Secretary of State for Foreign and Commonwealth Affairs, serving David Owen and Lord Carrington, for which he was decorated CMG in the New Year Honours of 1981. After his sabbatical at Harvard he was head of the planning staff at the FCO 1982–83, and then left the Diplomatic Service to stand for Parliament.

Politician
Walden was elected as the MP for Buckingham at the 1983 general election. He was Parliamentary Private Secretary to the then Secretary of State for Education and Science, Sir Keith Joseph, 1984–85 and Minister for Higher Education 1985–1987. He was re-elected in 1987 and 1992 and retired from parliament at the 1997 general election.  His successor was future Speaker of the House of Commons John Bercow.

Journalist
Walden wrote a column for the Evening Standard 1991–2002 and now writes for various papers as a guest columnist.

Publications
The Shoeblack and the Sovereign: Reflections on Ethics and Foreign Policy, New York: St. Martin's Press, 1988. 
The Blocked Society, Cambridge: Tory Reform Group, 1990
Ethics and Foreign Policy, London: Weidenfeld & Nicolson, 1990. 
We Should Know Better: Solving the Education Crisis, London: Fourth Estate, 1996. 
Lucky George: Memoirs of an Anti-Politician, London: Allen Lane, 1999. 
The New Elites: Making a Career in the Masses, London: Allen Lane, 2000. 
Who's a Dandy?: Dandyism and Beau Brummell (including a translation of Du Dandysme et de Georges Brummel by Jules Barbey), London: Gibson Square, 2002. 
God Won't Save America: Psychosis of a Nation, London: Gibson Square, 2006. 
Time to Emigrate?, London: Gibson Square, 2006.  (new edition 2007)
China: A Wolf in the World?, London: Gibson Square, 2011.

Family
In 1970 George Walden married the art historian Sarah Hunt, daughter of Dr Thomas Hunt, physician to Winston Churchill, Clement Attlee and Anthony Eden. They have two sons and a daughter, the journalist, novelist and critic Celia Pughe-Morgan. Pughe-Morgan is married to journalist Piers Morgan.

References
WALDEN, George Gordon Harvey, Who's Who 2012, A & C Black, 2012; online edn, Oxford University Press, Dec 2011, retrieved 21 Aug 2012

External links 
'The evil that Stalin did'. An article by George Walden discussing a letter from Nikolai Bukharin to Stalin. Published online by Yale University Press.
 

1939 births
Living people
People educated at Latymer Upper School
Alumni of Jesus College, Cambridge
Moscow State University alumni
Alumni of the University of Hong Kong
École nationale d'administration alumni
Harvard University alumni
British diplomats
Principal Private Secretaries to the Secretary of State for Foreign and Commonwealth Affairs
Conservative Party (UK) MPs for English constituencies
UK MPs 1983–1987
UK MPs 1987–1992
UK MPs 1992–1997
English male journalists
Companions of the Order of St Michael and St George
British Eurosceptics